Christoph Westerthaler (11 January 1965 – 20 July 2018) was an Austrian football coach and player.

Club career
Nicknamed Gischi, Westerthaler was a small-built striker who started his professional career at FC Wacker Innsbruck and stayed with them for nine years, split by a two-season period at LASK Linz. With the Tyrolean side he won two league titles and two domestic cups. In 1994, he moved to SK Vorwärts Steyr only to rejoin LASK two years later. In 1997, he moved abroad and played in Germany for the two major Frankfurt teams and VfL Osnabrück.

In the summer of 2001 he finished his career as a player because of a knee cartilage damage.

International career
Westerthaler made his debut for Austria in an October 1989 friendly match against Malta but was not considered for the 1990 FIFA World Cup. He earned 6 caps, no goals scored. His final international game was a November 1993 World Cup qualification match against Sweden.

Death
On 20 July 2018, Westerthaler died at the age of 53, due to a heart attack.

Honours
 Austrian Bundesliga: 1989, 1990
 Austrian Cup: 1989, 1993
 Austrian Bundesliga top goalscorer: 1992

External links
 
 German Bundesliga stats - Fussballportal

References

1965 births
2018 deaths
People from Imst District
Footballers from Tyrol (state)
Association football midfielders
Association football forwards
Austrian footballers
Austria international footballers
Austrian expatriate footballers
FC Wacker Innsbruck players
LASK players
SK Vorwärts Steyr players
APOEL FC players
Eintracht Frankfurt players
FSV Frankfurt players
VfL Osnabrück players
Austrian Football Bundesliga players
Bundesliga players
Cypriot First Division players
Expatriate footballers in Germany
Expatriate footballers in Cyprus
Austrian expatriate sportspeople in Germany
Austrian expatriate sportspeople in Cyprus
Austrian football managers
SV Horn managers
FC Tirol Innsbruck players
WSG Tirol players
FC Swarovski Tirol players